The  Cleveland Gladiators season was the 15th season for the franchise in the Arena Football League, and their fifth while in Cleveland. The team was coached by Steve Thonn and plays their home games at Quicken Loans Arena. By finishing the regular season with a 17–1 record, the Gladiators set a league record for wins in a single season (this record was tied one year later by the San Jose SaberCats).

Standings

Schedule

Regular season
The Gladiators began the season by visiting the Pittsburgh Power on March 15. Their final regular season game was on July 26, on the road against the Tampa Bay Storm.

Playoffs

 If Cleveland would have won ArenaBowl XXVII, they would have ended a 50+ year championship drought in the city of Cleveland. However, this feat would later be accomplished by the Cleveland Cavaliers in 2016 after coming back from a 3-1 deficit in the 2016 NBA finals to win over the Golden State Warriors.

Final roster

References

Cleveland Gladiators
Cleveland Gladiators seasons
Cleveland Gladiators